Davud Kola (also Romanized as Dāvūd Kolā; also known as Dāvūd Kolā-ye Pā’īn) is a village in Dasht-e Sar Rural District, Dabudasht District, Amol County, Mazandaran Province, Iran. At the 2006 census, its population was 457, in 118 families.  This village has a tourist area of Tooneh Keshun which has a forest texture with an area of ​​about 5,000 square meters and has a history of 500 years. Dehkhoda primary school was established in this village in 1348 and is still used. 
The village has two parts, the lower part of Davudkala which is located in the northern part of the village and the upper area of ​​Davudkola which is the southern part.The area around the village consists of agricultural lands.

References 

Populated places in Amol County